Everything but the Girl is an English musical duo formed in Kingston upon Hull in 1982, consisting of lead singer and occasional guitarist Tracey Thorn and guitarist, keyboardist, producer and singer Ben Watt. The group's early works have been categorized as sophisti-pop with jazz influences before undergoing an electronic turn following the worldwide success of the 1994 hit single "Missing".

The duo have accomplished four top ten and twelve top 40 singles in the UK and have received eight gold and two platinum album BPI certifications in the UK as well as one gold album RIAA certification in the US. Their cover of "I Don't Want to Talk About It" reached number three on the UK Singles Chart in 1988, a feat which would later be matched by "Missing", which charted high in several countries and reached number two on the U.S. Billboard Hot 100 in 1995 and spent over seven months on the UK Singles Chart thanks to an extremely popular remix by Todd Terry which later led to a Brit Award nomination for Best British Single.

Their ninth album Walking Wounded (1996) set a new career best by entering the UK albums chart at number four; it spawned the top ten singles "Walking Wounded" and "Wrong". The band went inactive in 2000, with Thorn declaring that she would no longer perform live. Thorn and Watt, who did not publicise their romantic relationship with each other while active, married in 2009, both released solo albums and said it was unlikely that Everything But the Girl would be active again.

However, in November 2022, Thorn announced that a new album had been recorded for release in spring 2023. Fuse, the band's first new material in 24 years, will be released on 21 April 2023.

History

Formation and early years
When Thorn and Watt met, they were both attending the University of Hull and both had contracted with the independent record company Cherry Red Records, as solo artists. Thorn was also a member of the trio Marine Girls. The pair each had solo album releases through Cherry Red: Thorn's 1982 LP was A Distant Shore, an eight-track mini-album. Watt's 1983 debut LP – the follow-up to his 1982 5-track EP Summer Into Winter featuring Robert Wyatt –  was entitled North Marine Drive.

They formed a duo and adopted the name "Everything but the Girl" from the slogan used by the Hull shop Turner's Furniture on Beverley Road.

EBTG's debut single, a cover version of Cole Porter's "Night and Day", was released in June 1982. After steady sales and exposure from a compilation album entitled Pillows & Prayers, the single was re-issued in August 1983.

Their debut album, Eden, was released in the UK in 1984. It reached number 14 on the UK Albums Chart, spending twenty weeks on the chart. It featured the single "Each and Every One", which reached number 28 on the UK top 40. Thorn wrote in 2016 that her lyric was misunderstood:

Our first single, "Each and Every One", was intended as an angry lyric about being a female musician, patronised and overlooked by male music critics. My band the Marine Girls had attracted several reviews along the lines of "not bad for a girl" and so the opening lines addressed this: "If you ever feel the time/To drop me a loving line/Maybe you should just think twice/I don’t wait around on your advice". It was the instructions of music critics I wasn’t waiting around for, but I wrote it too subtly, and so it was heard as a lovelorn lament, a lonely girl waiting for a letter from a boy.

In spite of their early history as established independent artists, to newcomers Everything but the Girl was considered part of the jazz/popular music style known as "sophisti-pop", alongside other British acts like Carmel, Swing Out Sister, Sade, Matt Bianco and The Style Council. Both Watt and Thorn were guest musicians on the Style Council's Café Bleu album, while EBTG worked with producer Robin Millar and engineers Ben Rogan and Mike Pela—who also collaborated with Sade—on their early albums. Although Eden was released in the UK, a different recording, Everything but the Girl, was released in the United States on the Sire label. The US release contains six tracks from Eden, two UK singles and four alternate tracks.

The 1985 album Love Not Money was their second studio album release, and signalled a move away from jazz and Latin influences to a more traditional electric guitar, bass and drums arrangements. The US edition included two additional songs that were not on the original UK release: a cover version of the Pretenders' song "Kid" and "Heaven Help Me".

The next year they released Baby, the Stars Shine Bright, recorded with an orchestra at Abbey Road Studios. They revealed the album's inspiration by their choices of B-sides for its single releases: songs from Bacharach and Jimmy Webb on the 12" versions (as well as a cover version of Patsy Cline's "I Fall to Pieces"). The first single from the album was "Come on Home", followed by "Don't Leave Me Behind".

In 1988, EBTG released Idlewild. Blending acoustic instrumentation with sequenced drums and synthesisers, it reached number 13 on the UK Albums Chart, spending fifteen weeks on the chart. A cover version of Danny Whitten's "I Don't Want to Talk About It", previously a success for Rod Stewart, was released as a single shortly afterwards. It reached number 3 on the UK Singles Chart and was added to the latter issues of the album. Around this time, Lloyd Cole and the Commotions asked Thorn to contribute vocals to the song "Big Snake" on their final studio album Mainstream.

Tommy Lipuma produced the band's 1990 album The Language of Life, which featured the single "Driving". "Driving" received heavy rotation on American adult alternative radio. The album featured a host of leading west coast session musicians including Omar Hakim, Joe Sample and Michael Brecker. Stan Getz contributed a tenor sax solo on the song "The Road".

In 1991, they released the self-produced album Worldwide. It charted at number 29 on the UK Albums Chart.

1992 saw the release of the acoustic Covers EP. It reached number 13 on the UK top 40. The lead track was "Love Is Strange". It also included cover versions of Bruce Springsteen's "Tougher Than the Rest"; Cyndi Lauper's "Time after Time" and Elvis Costello's "Alison". These four tracks were included on the US only album, Acoustic.

In the summer of 1992, the duo was forced to curtail recording and touring for several months when Watt developed Churg–Strauss syndrome, a rare autoimmune disease. Hospitalised for 10 weeks, and enduring several life-saving operations, he subsequently wrote a memoir, Patient, about his near-death ordeal.

In 1993, EBTG released two EPs in the UK. One featured a cover version of Paul Simon's "The Only Living Boy in New York". The other spawned a subsequent top ten UK hit, "I Didn't Know I Was Looking for Love", for Karen Ramirez.

Worldwide acclaim
1994 saw EBTG release their seventh album, Amplified Heart, a hybrid of folk rock and electronica featuring contributions from guitarist Richard Thompson, double bassist Danny Thompson, drummer Dave Mattacks, and producer/programmer John Coxon. Producer Todd Terry remixed the track "Missing", and when released as a single, it became an international success. It reached the top ten around the world, including the US, where it peaked at No. 2 in the Billboard Hot 100.

While recording Amplified Heart Thorn and Watt wrote lyrics and music for two tracks – "Protection" and "Better Things" on Massive Attack's second album Protection. Thorn sang lead vocals on both. The single "Protection" reached number 14 on the UK top 40. The album reached number 4 on the UK Albums Chart.

Buoyed by the recent successes and out of contract at WEA, EBTG released the self-produced Walking Wounded in 1996 exclusively licensed to Atlantic Records for the United States and Canada and  Virgin Records for the Rest of the World. Featuring collaborations with Spring Heel Jack and Howie B it ushered in a new electronic sound for their own work. It charted at number 4 on the UK Albums Chart and spawned two top ten UK singles – "Walking Wounded" and "Wrong". Two further singles – "Single" and "Before Today" – reached number 20 and number 25 respectively.

In 1999, the duo followed it up with their ninth and final studio album, Temperamental. It charted at number 16 on the UK Albums Chart.

The duo performed their final show at the Montreux Jazz Festival in 2000.

Extended hiatus

Between 2000 and 2022, there were no new recordings from Everything but the Girl. In 2002, 2004 and 2005, the duo curated compilations of their material. The 2004 compilation, Like the Deserts Miss the Rain, was a DVD release that included footage of a 1999 performance at the Forum venue in London, UK, for which John McKenzie and long-time collaborator Martin Ditcham performed alongside the pair as session musicians.

From 1999, Watt concentrated on DJ and production/remix work, finding success as one half of Lazy Dog, with partner Jay Hannan, and collaborating with Beth Orton on her 1999 album Central Reservation and her 2002 album Daybreaker. Watt then proceeded with a new angle on his solo career that included launching the Buzzin' Fly record label in 2003, and becoming the part-owner-founder of the Neighbourhood and Cherry Jam nightclubs from 2002–2005. Watt released a string of club-oriented productions including the Bright Star EP, with producer Stimming and British singer Julia Biel, on Buzzin' Fly in 2010.

In 2005, Thorn co-wrote and recorded vocals for the song "Damage", a collaboration with German band Tiefschwarz that appeared on their Eat Books album. Thorn's second solo album, Out of the Woods, was then released in 2007, followed by her third solo album, Love and Its Opposite, in 2010. In October 2011, Thorn released a cover version of The xx's "Night Time", on which Watt played guitar and sang backing vocals. This was their first recording together in over a decade, although it was not an Everything but the Girl release.

In an April 2011 interview, Thorn was asked whether she would ever work again with Watt as Everything but the Girl. Thorn responded, "Yes, we do keep saying we are nearly ready to maybe do some work together again. There are certain obstacles, some practical, some psychological, that we would need to overcome. But it may well happen." A collection of Christmas songs, Tinsel and Lights, for which Thorn recorded cover versions of Christmas songs with two new original songs, was released in October 2012 on Buzzin' Fly's sister record label Strange Feeling. Watt and the couple's children provided backing vocals on the original song "Joy".

In 2012, the band's first four albums were reissued by Edsel Records as "deluxe" double CDs, with demo recordings and other additional material. At the time, Watt explained that Warner Music Group still maintained control over their back catalogue: "our big fear was that one day we'd wake up and they'd have reissued them, without telling us."; when the representative from Edsel, a company that specialises in reissued material, made contact, the couple decided that the time was appropriate. Additionally, Thorn stated that the thought of reforming the band and playing live filled her "with cold dread"—upon re-listening to the early EBTG records, Thorn experienced a sense of "Gosh, well, I'm not really that person any more."

A second tranche of Demon/Edsel reissues, covering the four albums released between 1990 and 1994, was announced in September 2013. According to the EBTG website, "Once again, Ben and Tracey have helped at every stage of the process, sourcing demos, rarities and memorabilia for the releases."

The band's final two albums, Walking Wounded and Temperamental were given the deluxe treatment and were reissued by Demon/Edsel on 4 September 2015.

Watt hit the pause button on his record labels and DJ activities to return to his folk-jazz singer-songwriter roots in 2014. His first solo album since 1983, Hendra was released on 14 April 2014. It featured collaborations with Bernard Butler, formerly of the band Suede, Berlin-based producer Ewan Pearson and David Gilmour of Pink Floyd. The album won the 'Best 'Difficult' Second Album' category at the AIM Independent Music Awards 2014. It was included at No 27 in Uncuts Top 75 Albums of 2014. He followed it up in 2016 with Fever Dream.  It continued his relationship with Bernard Butler, and added guest cameos from MC Taylor of North Carolina folk-rock band, Hiss Golden Messenger, and Boston singer-songwriter Marissa Nadler. It received a 9/10 review in Uncut magazine. In a four-star review, The Guardian said: 'In his early 50s, he is making some of the best music of his career.'

In addition to solo music projects, both Thorn and Watt have written books. Thorn's 2013 memoir, Bedsit Disco Queen, covers a significant portion of the history of EBTG as a band.

In July 2017, Everything but the Girl reclaimed the rights to eight of their albums, plus the American rights to Temperamental and Walking Wounded from Warner Music Group; this catalogue will now be distributed through Chrysalis Records under licence from Watt's Strange Feeling label.

Comeback and Fuse

On 2 November 2022, Thorn announced on Twitter that a new Everything but the Girl album had been recorded and would be released in spring 2023.

The first single from their forthcoming album Fuse, "Nothing Left to Lose" premiered on BBC Radio 6 Music on 10 January 2023. Fuse will be released 21 April 2023 and will feature "Nothing Left to Lose" and nine more original songs both electronic and acoustic.

Awards and nominations
{| class=wikitable
|-
! Year !! Awards !! Work !! Category !! Result
|-
| rowspan="4" | 1996
| MTV EMA
| rowspan=2|Themselves
| Best Dance 
| 
|-
| Viva Comet Awards
| Best International Act
| 
|-
| Brit Awards
| rowspan="2" |"Missing"
| Best British Single
|  
|-
| Ivor Novello Awards
| The Best Selling Song 
| 
|-
| 2000
| Billboard Music Video Awards
| "Five Fathoms"
| Dance Clip of the Year
| 
|-
| 2007
| BMI London Awards
| "Missing"
| 3 Million Award
|

Collaborations
Under the Cover – Other People Sing Other People's Songs – "Alfie" (1988)
"Protection" (with Massive Attack)
Batman Forever Soundtrack – "The Hunter Gets Captured by the Game" (with Massive Attack)
Back to Mine – mix CD compiled by Everything but the Girl
She's Having a Baby Soundtrack – "Apron Strings"
 Red Hot + Rio (1996 AIDS benefit album produced by the Red Hot Organization) – "Corcovado (Quiet Night of Quiet Stars)"
The Saint Motion Picture Soundtrack – "Before Today" (2005)

Discography

Eden (1984)
Love Not Money (1985)
Baby, the Stars Shine Bright (1986)
Idlewild (1988)
The Language of Life (1990)
Worldwide (1991)
Acoustic (1992)
Amplified Heart (1994)
Walking Wounded (1996)
Temperamental (1999)
Fuse (2023)

References

External links

 Official website
 
 
 

1982 establishments in England
English electronic music duos
English new wave musical groups
English pop music duos
British indie pop groups
Female-fronted musical groups
Male–female musical duos
Married couples
Musical groups from Kingston upon Hull
Musical groups established in 1982
Musical groups disestablished in 2000
Musical groups reestablished in 2022
Rock music duos
Blanco y Negro Records artists
Sire Records artists
Atlantic Records artists
Virgin Records artists
Sophisti-pop musical groups
Trip hop groups
Video game musicians
Cherry Red Records artists
Chrysalis Records artists